Margarites vityazi is a species of sea snail, a marine gastropod mollusk in the family Margaritidae.

Description
The height of the shell attains 8 mm.

Distribution
This marine species occurs south of Alaska.

References

External links

vityazi
Gastropods described in 2000